Zachary Michael Gilford (born January 14, 1982) is an American actor, known for his role as Matt Saracen on the NBC sports drama series Friday Night Lights. In 2021, he starred in the Netflix horror limited series Midnight Mass. In 2022, he appeared in the horror mystery-thriller series The Midnight Club.

Early life and education
Gilford was born in Evanston, Illinois, the son of Anne and Steve Gilford. His mother is Lutheran, and his father is Jewish. He graduated from Evanston Township High School and Northwestern University. He worked as a trip leader for Adventures Cross-Country and has led wilderness and adventure trips for teenagers to Alaska, British Columbia, California, Hawaii, and the South Pacific. Gilford also worked as a staff member for YMCA Camp Echo in Fremont, Michigan.

Acting career
In 2005, he appeared in an episode of Law & Order: Special Victims Unit. In 2006, Gilford landed a regular role in Friday Night Lights, in which he played the role of Matt Saracen in the main cast, from Season 1 to Season 3. In 2009, Gilford was switched to the recurring cast in Seasons 4 and 5. That year, he also made his feature film debut, co-starring in The Last Winter (2006). He had a cameo in the film Rise: Blood Hunter and guest starred in an episode of Grey's Anatomy.

In 2009, he co-starred as Adam Davies in the romantic comedy Post Grad opposite Alexis Bledel.  He also starred as Johnny Drake in the romantic drama Dare opposite Emmy Rossum. In 2010, he starred as Gus in the indie drama film The River Why alongside Amber Heard. He had a cameo in the movie Super.

In 2010, he joined the cast of ABC's medical drama Off The Map  which premiered in January 2011 but was cancelled after 13 episodes. In 2011, he appeared in Taylor Swift's music video for "Ours", in which he played her love interest. He played the role of Evan in the drama film Answers to Nothing. In 2012, he starred as Seth in the indie drama film In Our Nature alongside Jena Malone.

In 2012, he was cast in another medical drama, The Mob Doctor, on Fox, opposite Jordana Spiro; however this was also cancelled after 13 episodes. In January 2013, he appeared with Arnold Schwarzenegger in The Last Stand. He played the role of Matthew Iris in the film Crazy Kind of Love.

He co-starred alongside Allison Miller in the horror film Devil's Due (2014), set in New Orleans and the Dominican Republic, and released on January 17, 2014.  He also co-starred in the film sequel The Purge: Anarchy, released on July 18, 2014. He guest starred in shows such as Drunk History, Tim and Eric's Bedtime Stories and Kingdom. In 2016, he starred as Danny Warren in the ABC drama series The Family. In 2017, Gilford starred as Conner Hooks in the YouTube Red futuristic web series Lifeline.

Since 2018, Gilford has had a recurring role as Gregg in the NBC series Good Girls. In 2019, Gilford was cast as Ben Walker in the Bad Boys spinoff drama L.A.'s Finest. Zach also held a leading role in Midnight Mass released in 2021. In 2022, Gilford was cast in a recurring role as Elias Voit, the series recurring unsub in Criminal Minds: Evolution. His real life spouse Kiele Sanchez joins the series as his wife Sydney Voit.

Personal life
In the spring of 2010, Gilford began dating actress Kiele Sanchez, whom he met on the set of the television pilot for the TV movie Matadors. The couple became engaged in November 2011, and married on December 29, 2012. The couple also co-starred in The Purge: Anarchy. In August 2015, Sanchez announced that she and Gilford were expecting a son in November. In October 2015, they announced that Sanchez had suffered a late-term miscarriage. The couple have one daughter, born in November 2017 through surrogacy.

Filmography

Film

Television

Music videos

References

External links
 

1982 births
21st-century American male actors
American male film actors
American male television actors
Evanston Township High School alumni
Jewish American male actors
Living people
Male actors from Evanston, Illinois
Northwestern University School of Communication alumni
21st-century American Jews